Barbora Krejčíková and Kateřina Siniaková defeated Bethanie Mattek-Sands and Iga Świątek in the final, 6–4, 6–2 to win the women's doubles tennis title at the 2021 French Open. It was their second French Open title and third major title together. Krejčíková became the first woman to win both the singles and doubles tournaments at a major since Serena Williams at the 2016 Wimbledon Championships, and the first to do so at the French Open since Mary Pierce in 2000, making her the seventh woman to accomplish the sweep in French Open history.

By winning the title, Krejčíková also reclaimed the world No. 1 doubles ranking. Kristina Mladenovic and Hsieh Su-wei were both in contention for the ranking, but Mladenovic did not participate and Hsieh lost in the third round.

Tímea Babos and Mladenovic were the two-time reigning champions, but Mladenovic did not participate. Babos partnered Vera Zvonareva, but the pair were defeated in the first round by Petra Martić and Shelby Rogers.

Seeds

Draw

Finals

Top half

Section 1

Section 2

Bottom half

Section 3

Section 4

Other entry information

Wild cards

Protected ranking

Alternate pairs

Withdrawals
Before the tournament
  Paula Badosa /  Alizé Cornet → replaced by  Paula Badosa /  Aliona Bolsova
  Ashleigh Barty /  Jennifer Brady → replaced by  Greet Minnen /  Alison Van Uytvanck
  Belinda Bencic /  Sofia Kenin → replaced by  Zarina Diyas /  Varvara Gracheva
  Hayley Carter /  Luisa Stefani → replaced by  Hayley Carter /  Astra Sharma
  Coco Gauff /  Caty McNally → replaced by  Coco Gauff /  Venus Williams
  Nina Stojanović /  Jil Teichmann → replaced by  Jasmine Paolini /  Nina Stojanović

During the tournament
  Ellen Perez /  Zheng Saisai

Retirements
  Misaki Doi /  Polona Hercog

References

External links
Main Draw

French Open - Doubles
Women's Doubles